Soledad Miria (in the Kuna language Miria Ubigantupu or more recently Mirya Ubgigandub) is a small Caribbean island of Panama with 1,014 inhabitants. The island is only 700 metres long but is densely populated. At approximately 9:30 pm on December 26, 2006, a fire started by the explosion of a gas cooker destroyed 39 buildings within 10 minutes, approximately half of those on the island. 348 people were injured, but none died. The island was left with no potable water. Many of the inhabitants of the small island took to the sea in fishing boats to avoid the flames.

References

Caribbean islands of Panama